C. P. "Roy" Goree was a college football player for the Georgia Tech Yellow Jackets. He made All-Southern in 1911. Both his sons also played for Tech. He is a member of Tech Hall of Fame.

References

American football ends
American football fullbacks
All-Southern college football players
Georgia Tech Yellow Jackets football players